The Wigan rail crash was a railway accident which occurred at Wigan North Western station, England, to a northbound excursion train in the early morning of 3 August 1873. Thirteen passengers were killed after derailed carriages collided with station buildings. The train was declared to have been travelling at excessive speed.

Circumstances
In Victorian times annual holidays to Scotland were popular amongst the affluent, inspired by Queen Victoria's visits to Balmoral Castle. The 'Tourist Special' which left London Euston at 20:00 on 2 August 1873 drawn by two locomotives consisted of 25 vehicles by the time it left Crewe including many private family coaches. Many of the passengers were aristocrats travelling north for the opening of the grouse season.

As the long train ran through Wigan North Western station the driver glanced back and saw sparks flying to the rear of the train. After drawing to a stand he walked back to find an appalling sight at the south end of the down platform. The first 15 carriages of the fast-moving train had passed safely through the station, but two wheels of the 16th coach had derailed at a set of facing points. Two of the passengers of the 16th coach were Lady Florence Leveson-Gower and her companion Miss Braggs. Next came a luggage van which had derailed completely, demolished a lineside shunter's cabin and lost its side in the process. The couplings held on both these two vehicles and they travelled the length of the platform and were rerailed by a crossing at the north end. However the following carriages had all derailed on the points and broken away from the train. They lay shattered at the start of the platform and on the passing loop behind it, leaving 13 dead and 30 injured. Only the last coach and rear brake-van were undamaged. The front portion of the train continued to Scotland 90 minutes later.

Investigation
The lengthy enquiry failed to find any fault with the offending points which indeed had suffered virtually no damage. However almost all the passengers stated that they had been alarmed by the speed of the train and the rocking of the carriages on the journey up from Euston. The conclusion of the enquiry was that the speed of the train had been excessive, especially considering its motley collection of carriages. However, an extra tie-bar was added to points so as to increase their strength and stability, a design modification which remains in current points on the national network.

Sources

External links
Contemporary illustration of the scene immediately after the disaster
Wigan rail crash entry in the Railway Archives database

Railway accidents and incidents in Lancashire
Railway accidents in 1873
1873 in England
Railway accidents and incidents in Greater Manchester
Rail transport in Greater Manchester
Accidents and incidents involving London and North Western Railway
History of Wigan
1870s in Lancashire
Derailments in England
August 1873 events
Rail accidents caused by a driver's error
1873 disasters in the United Kingdom